The holonephros is the kidney of the larvae of cyclostomes and the Gymnophiona. The entire mass of nephrogenic tissue gives rise to this kidney, which is usually of simple form with a single tubule in each segment.

External links
 Comparative Vertebrate Anatomy, BIOLOGY 308, Urogenital System, Richard Fox, Lander University

Urinary system